Lennia maracanda, the scarce large recluse, is a species of butterfly in the family Hesperiidae. It is found in Ivory Coast, Nigeria, Cameroon, Angola, the Democratic Republic of the Congo and north-western Zambia.

The larvae have been recorded feeding on a climbing rattan palm in the family Arecaceae.

References

Butterflies described in 1876
Erionotini
Butterflies of Africa
Taxa named by William Chapman Hewitson